Acacia pusilla is a shrub of the genus Acacia and the subgenus Phyllodineae the is endemic to south western Australia.

Description
Like most species of Acacia it has phyllodes rather than true leaves. The crowded and grey-green and glabrous phyllodes are found on raised stem-projections and are patent to erect. It blooms from September to October and produces yellow flowers.

Taxonomy
The species was first formally described by the botanist Bruce Maslin in 1999 as part of the work The taxonomy of fifty-five species of Acacia, primarily Western Australian, in section Phyllodineae as published in the journal Nuytsia. It was reclassified as Racosperma pusillum by Leslie Pedley in 2003 and transferred back to genus Acacia in 2014. It is closely related to Acacia rhamphophylla and resembles Acacia lachnophylla.

Distribution
It is native to an area along the south coast in the Goldfields-Esperance region of Western Australia from around Esperance in the west to around Israelite Bay in the east where it is found around the margins of salt lakes and on sandplains growing in sandy-clay soils often around limestone. The bulk of the population is found in the Ravensthorpe Range situated on the lower slopes often around watercourses as a part of dense mallee shrub and woodland communities.

See also
 List of Acacia species

References

pusilla
Acacias of Western Australia
Plants described in 1999
Taxa named by Bruce Maslin